The Queensland school mackerel (Scomberomorus queenslandicus) is a species of fish in the family Scombridae. It is found in tropical waters of the western Pacific, largely confined to inshore coastal waters of southern Papua New Guinea and northern and eastern Australia, from Shark Bay and Onslow, Western Australia to Sydney, New South Wales. Queensland school mackerel commonly occur in waters down to 100 m, usually to 30 m, in depth. Specimens have been recorded at up to 100 cm in length, and weighing up to 12.2 kg.

References

 
 

Taxa named by Ian Stafford Ross Munro
Fish described in 1943
Scomberomorus